Ditchford railway station is a former railway station on Ditchford Road, Northamptonshire on the former Northampton and Peterborough Railway line which connected Peterborough and Northampton.In 1846 the line, along with the London and Birmingham, became part of the London and North Western Railway.

At grouping in 1923 it became part of the London Midland and Scottish Railway.

Ditchford is famous as the locality of reputed treacle mines. The origin of this fantasy is obscure, though the station's sidings were primarily to serve a nearby ironstone quarry. For most of its existence although on the bank of the river Nene it was without mains water, which had to be brought in each day by train. The Station Master had the power to stop any train so that his family could travel to Wellingborough and its remoteness meant that it saw little business and it closed to passengers in  1924. It was occasionally used by railwaymen until 1952.

The former service 
The service was from Peterborough to Northampton via Wellingborough. The station opened in 1845 and closed in 1924 to passengers.

References

External links
 Subterranea Britannica

Railway stations in Great Britain opened in 1845
Railway stations in Great Britain closed in 1924
Disused railway stations in Northamptonshire
Former London and Birmingham Railway stations
John William Livock buildings
Irthlingborough